The martial eagle (Polemaetus bellicosus) is a large eagle native to sub-Saharan Africa. It is the only member of the genus Polemaetus. A species of the booted eagle subfamily (Aquilinae), it has feathering over its tarsus. One of the largest and most powerful species of booted eagle, it is a fairly opportunistic predator that varies its prey selection between mammals, birds and reptiles. It is one of few eagle species known to hunt primarily from a high soar, by stooping on its quarry. An inhabitant of wooded belts of otherwise open savanna, this species has shown a precipitous decline in the last few centuries due to a variety of factors. The martial eagle is one of the most persecuted bird species in the world. Due to its habit of taking livestock and regionally valuable game, local farmers and game wardens frequently seek to eliminate martial eagles, although the effect of eagles on this prey is almost certainly considerably exaggerated. Currently, the martial eagle is classified with the status of Endangered by the IUCN.Simmons, R.E. (2005). Martial Eagle Polemaetus bellicosus. Roberts’ Birds of southern Africa, 7th edition. Hockey, PAR, Dean, WRJ and Ryan, PG (eds), 538-539.

Range
The martial eagle can be found in most of sub-Saharan Africa, wherever food is abundant and the environment favourable. Although never common, greater population densities do exist in southern Africa and in some parts of east Africa. Martial eagles tend to be rare and irregular in west Africa but are known to reside in Senegal, The Gambia and northern Guinea-Bissau, southern Mali and the northern portions of Ivory Coast and Ghana. From southern Niger and eastern Nigeria the species is distributed spottily through Chad, Sudan and the Central African Republic as well as the northern, eastern, and southern portions of the Democratic Republic of the Congo. In east Africa, they range from Somaliland and Ethiopia more or less continuously south through Kenya, Uganda, Tanzania and in southern Africa from Angola, Zambia, Malawi and southern Mozambique to South Africa. Some of the larger remaining populations are known to persist in Zimbabwe and South Africa. Generally, these birds are more abundant in protected areas such as Kruger National Park and Kgalagadi Transfrontier Park in South Africa, or Etosha National Park in Namibia.

Taxonomy

The Accipitridae family  (hereafter accipitrids) is by far the most diverse family of diurnal raptors in the world, with more than 230 currently accepted species. As a member of the booted eagle subfamily, Aquilinae, the martial eagle is one of the roughly 15% of extant species in the family to have feathers covering its legs. This helps distinguish these species from other eagles and raptors, as they are present even in tropical species such as the martial eagle. Under current classifications, booted eagles consist of approximately 38 living species that are distributed in every continent inhabited by the accipitrids, which excludes only the continent of Antarctica. Just under half of the living species of booted eagle are found in Africa. Studies have been conducted on the mitochondrial DNA of most booted eagle species, including the martial eagle, to gain insight on how the subfamily is ordered and which species bear relation to one another. DNA testing in the 1980s indicated the martial eagle was a specialized off-shoot of the small-bodied Hieraaetus eagles, and one study went so far as to advocate that the martial eagle be included in the genus. However, more modern and comprehensive genetic testing has shown that the martial eagle is distinct from other living booted eagles and diverged from other extant genera several million years ago. Genetically, the martial eagle fell between two other species in monotypical genera, the African long-crested eagle (Lophaetus occipitalis) and the Asian rufous-bellied eagle (Lophotriorchis kienerii), that similarly diverged long ago from other modern species. Given the disparity of this species’ unique morphology and that the two aforementioned most closely related living species are only about as large as the bigger buzzards, the unique heritage of the martial eagle is evident. 

There are no subspecies of martial eagle, and the species varies little in appearance and genetic diversity across its distribution.

Description

The martial eagle is a very large eagle. Its total length – in comparison to its wingspan – is restricted by its relatively short tail. Nonetheless, it appears to be the sixth or seventh longest extant eagle species. Wingspans of as much as  have been reported but may be unsubstantiated. Thus, the martial eagle appears to average fourth in wingspan among living eagles, behind only the Steller's sea-eagle (Haliaeetus pelagicus), the white-tailed eagle (Haliaeetus albicilla) and the wedge-tailed eagle (Aquila audax), in roughly that order. For a species that is fairly homogeneous in its genetic make-up, the body mass of martial eagles is surprisingly variable. To some extent, the variation of body masses in the species is attributable to considerable reverse sexual dimorphism as well as varying environmental conditions of various eagle populations. In weight range, the martial eagle broadly overlaps in size with the golden eagle (Aquila chrysaetos) and Verreaux's eagle (and is even exceeded by them in maximum known body mass). The renders the golden and martial eagles as tied as the largest African eagles (by body mass but not in total length or wingspan, in which the martial bests the golden), as well as the heaviest two species of booted eagle in the world and as tied as the sixth heaviest eagles in the world, after the three largest species of sea eagle (Steller's being the heaviest extant, the others ranking 4th and 5th), the harpy eagle (Harpia harpyja) and the Philippine eagle (Pithecophaga jefferyi). The longest African eagle (and second longest booted eagle after the wedge-tailed eagle (Aquila audax)) is the crowned eagle by virtue of its relatively longer tail, as its body weight is slightly less than these three heaviest booted eagle species.

Sexual dimorphism

Martial eagles are highly sexually dimorphic. While females average about 10% larger in linear dimension, in body mass, the sexual dimorphism of martial eagles is more pronounced. Seven males in southern Africa averaged  and five in another dataset averaged . Twelve adult males in Maasai Mara, Kenya averaged . In southern Africa, seven females averaging . Elsewhere, a claim was made of an average of  almost certainly describes a sample entirely of female specimens. In the Maasai Mara, 7 females averaged . Thus the dimorphism by weight is roughly 36% in favor of the female, which is unusually out-of-sync with the linear differences between the sexes. For example, the greater spotted eagle (Clanga clanga), the most sexually dimorphic booted eagle overall with a linear difference between the sexes of 20%, has around the same level of sexual dimorphism by body mass as the martial eagle which show about half as much linear dimorphism. Meanwhile, females measure  in wing chord,  in tail length and  tarsal length. Overall, the bulk and much more massive proportions of females, which include more robust feet and longer tarsi, may at times allow experienced observers to sex lone birds in the wild.

Colouring and field identification

The adult's plumage consists of dark brown coloration on the upperparts, head and upper chest, with an occasional slightly lighter edging to these feathers. The dark feathers can appear grayish, blackish or even plum-colored depending on lighting conditions. The body underparts are feathered white with sparse but conspicuous blackish-brown spotting. The underwing coverts are dark brown, with the remiges being pale streaked with black, overall imparting the wings of adults a dark look. The underside of the tail has similar barring as the remiges while the upperside is the same uniform brown as the back and upperwing coverts. The eyes of mature martial eagles are rich yellow, while the cere and large feet pale greenish and the talons black.  Martial eagles have a short erectile crest, which is typically neither prominent nor flared (unlike that of the crowned eagle) and generally appears as an angular back to a seemingly flat head. This species often perches in a quite upright position, with its long wings completely covering the tail, causing it be described as “standing” rather than “sitting” on a branch when perched. In flight, martial eagles bear long broad wings with relatively narrow rounded tips that can appear pointed at times depending on how the eagle is holding its wings. It is capable of flexible beats with gliding on flattish wings, or slightly raised in a dihedral. This species often spends a large portion of the day on the wing, more so than probably any other African eagles, and often at a great height. Juvenile martial eagles are conspicuously distinct in plumage with a pearly gray colour above with considerable white edging, as well as a speckled grey effect on crown and hind neck. The entire underside is conspicuously white. The wing coverts of juveniles are mottled grey-brown and white, with patterns of bars on primaries and tail that are similar to adult but lighter and greyer. In the fourth or fifth years, a very gradual increase to brownish feather speckling is noted but the back and crown remain a fairly pale grey. At this age, there may be increasing spots on throat and chest which coalesce into a gorget and some spots on abdomen may variably manifest as well.  The eyes of juveniles are dark brown. This species reaches adult plumage by its seventh year with the transition to adult plumage happening quite rapidly after many years in a little-changing juvenile plumage.

There are few serious identification challenges for the species. The black-chested snake eagle (Circaetus pectoralis) is similar in overall colouring (despite its name it is brown on the chest and the back, being no darker than the adult martial eagle) to martial eagles but is markedly smaller, with a more prominent, rounded head with large eyes, plain, spotless abdomen, bare and whitish legs. In flight, the profile of the snake eagle is quite different, with nearly white (rather than dark brown) flight feathers and much smaller, narrower wings and a relatively larger tail. For juveniles, the main source for potential confusion is the juvenile crowned eagle, which also regularly perches in an erect position. The proportions of crowned eagles are quite distinct from martial eagles as they have much shorter wings and a distinctly longer tail. The juvenile crowned eagle has a whiter head, more scaled back, and spotted thighs and legs lacking in the martial eagle. Beyond their distinct flight profile by wing and tail proportions, crowned eagles have whiter and more obviously banded flight-feathers and tail. Other large immature eagles in Africa tend to be much darker and more heavily marked both above and below than martial eagles.

Predatory physiology

Martial eagles have been noted as remarkable for their extremely keen eyesight (3.0–3.6 times human acuity), partly due to their eye being nearly as large as a human's eye. Their visual acuity may rival some eagles from the genus Aquila and some of the larger falcons as the greatest of all diurnal raptors. The talons of martial eagles are impressive and can approach the size, especially in mature females, of those of the crowned eagle despite their slenderer metatarsus and toes compared to the crowned species. Accipitrids usually kill their prey with an elongated, sharp hind toe claw, which is referred to as the hallux claw and is reliably the largest talon in members of the accipitrid family. The average length of the hallux claw in unsexed martial eagles from Tsavo East National Park, Kenya was found to be . The inner claw on the front of the foot of the martial eagle is especially sizeable proportional to other extremities and unusually can approach, if not reach, the same size as the hallux claw. This inner claw was found to average , in comparison to that of the crowned eagle which measures . The tarsus is quite long in martial eagles, the fourth longest of any living eagle and the longest of any booted eagle species, seemingly an adaptation to prey capture in long grass, including potentially dangerous prey. The bill is larger than the average bill of the large members of the genus Aquila but is notably smaller than those of the large species of sea eagle and the Philippine eagle. The gape size of martial eagles is relatively large, however, being proportionally larger than in other booted eagle species behind (albeit considerably behind) the Indian spotted eagle (Clanga hastata) and the steppe eagle (Aquila nipalensis) in relative gape size, indicating a relative specialization towards swallowing large prey whole.

Voice
The martial eagle is a weak and infrequent vocaliser. Little vocal activity has been reported even during the breeding season. The recorded contact call between pair-members consists of the birds, usually when perched, letting out a low mellow whistle, . More or less the same vocalisation is known to have been uttered by females when male brings food and repeated mildly by large begging young. During territorial aerial display and sometimes when perched, adults may utter a loud, trilling . The territorial call may be heard from some distance. Recent fledglings also at times make this call. A soft  may be heard, made by pairs around their nest, perhaps being a mutual contact call. In comparison, the crowned eagle is highly vocal especially in the context of breeding.

Habitat

The martial eagle is to some degree adaptable to varied habitats but shows an overall preference for open woods and woodland edges, wooded savannah and thornbush habitats. These eagles also avoid closed-canopy forests and hyper-arid desert. As such it is mostly absent from Guinean and Congolian forests, despite the species’ requirement for large trees for nesting purposes. It is shown that martial eagles can inhabit forests locally in areas where openings occur. For example, in a bird atlas for the country of Kenya, perhaps surprisingly, 88% of martial eagles were found to reside in well-wooded areas and they occurred in areas where annual rainfall exceeded . In southern Africa, they have adapted to seemingly more open habitats than elsewhere in their range, such as semi-desert and open savanna with scattered trees, wooded hillocks and, as a recent adaptation, around pylons. In the desert areas of Namibia, they utilize ephemeral rivers that flow occasionally and allow large trees to grow. They usually seem to prefer desolate or protected areas. In the Karoo of South Africa, they consistently avoid areas with moderate to heavy cultivation or with heavier or more consistent winter rainfall. One study on the occurrence of diurnal raptors in protected areas against unprotected areas found that martial eagle detection was nearly twice as frequent in protected areas during the dry season and more than three times as frequent during the wet season than in unprotected areas.

Behaviour
The martial eagle spends an exceptional amount of the time in the air, often soaring about hill slopes high enough that binoculars are often needed to perceive them. When not breeding, both mature eagles from a breeding pair may be found roosting on their own in some prominent tree up to several miles from their nesting haunt, probably hunting for several days in one area, until viable prey resources are exhausted, and then moving on to another area. However, martial eagles, especially adult birds, are typically devoted to less disturbed areas, both due to these typically offering more extensive prey selection and their apparent dislike for a considerable human presence. Martial eagles tend to be very solitary and are not known to tolerate others of the own species in the area outside of the pair during the breeding season. In general this species is more shy towards humans than other big eagles of Africa, but may be seen passing over populated country at times. The most frequently seen type of martial eagle away from traditional habitats are presumed nomadic subadults. Another martial eagle ringed as a nestling was found to have moved  in 11 months.

Dietary biology

The martial eagle is one of the world's most powerful avian predators. Due to both its underside spotting and ferocious efficiency as a predator it is sometimes nicknamed “the leopard of the air”. The martial eagle is an apex predator, being at the top of the avian food chain in its environment. In its common, scientific and most regional African names, this species name means “war-like” and indicates the force, brashness and indefatigable nature of their hunting habits. The aggressiveness of the hunting martial eagle, which may rival that of the overall behaviorally bolder crowned eagle, can seem incongruous with their other behaviours, as it otherwise is considered a shy, wary and evasive bird. Martial eagles have been seen to charge at much larger adult ungulates and rake at their heads and flanks, at times presumably to separate the mammals from their young so they can take the latter with more ease. At other times, these eagles will set down upon a wide range of potentially dangerous prey including other aggressive predators in broad daylight, such as monitor lizards, venomous snakes, jackals and medium-sized wild cats. Adult eagles tend to hunt larger, potentially dangerous prey more often than immature ones, presumably as they refine their hunting skills with maturity. The martial eagle hunts mostly in flight, circling at a great height anywhere in its home range. When prey is perceived with their superb vision, the hunting eagle then stoops sharply to catch its prey by surprise with the prey often being unable to perceive the eagle at nearly as far as the eagle can perceive them despite often being in the open. The martial eagle tends to hunt in a long, shallow stoop; however, when the quarry is seen in a more enclosed space, it parachutes down at a steeper angle. The speed of descent is controlled by the angle at which the wings are held above the back. At the point of impact, it shoots its long legs forward, often killing victims on impact, somewhat as large falcons often dispatch their prey. On occasion, they may still-hunt from a high perch or concealed in vegetation near watering holes. If the initial attempt fails, they may swoop around to attempt again, especially if the intended victim is not dangerous. If the quarry is potentially hazardous, such as mammalian carnivores, venomous snakes or large ungulates, and becomes aware of the eagle too soon, the eagle tends to abandon the hunt. Unusually for a bird of its size, it may rarely hover while hunting. This hunting method may be employed particularly if the quarry is any of the aforementioned potentially dangerous prey items such as venomous snakes or carnivores. Other large eagles may similarly (if infrequently) hover over prey such as canids and then quickly drop onto if the quarry makes the mistake of pointing its dangerous mouth downwards, then gripping its victim on the back while controlling the neck with the other foot until blood loss is sufficient to kill the prey. Prey, including birds, are generally killed on the ground, with infrequent reports of prey taken from trees. Some larger (and presumably slower-flying) avian prey may be taken while in flight; victims of successful hunts have consisted of water birds such as herons, storks and geese. If kills are too large and heavy to carry in flight, both members of a pair may return to the kill over several days, probably roosting nearby. If nesting, the pair tends to dismember pieces of large kills such as limbs to bring to the nest. Much of the large prey, perhaps most, that is left on the ground is lost to scavengers.

The diet of the martial eagle varies greatly with prey availability and can be dictated largely by opportunity. Remarkably, mammals, birds and reptiles can in turn dominate the prey selection of martial eagles in a given area, with no one prey type globally dominating their prey spectrum. In some areas, both mammals and birds can each comprise more than 80% of the prey selection. Over 170 prey species have been reported for the martial eagle which is a much higher number than the full prey spectrum of other larger African booted eagles, and even this may neglect some of the prey they take in the little studied populations from west and central Africa and the northern part of east Africa. However, the mean prey body mass is considerably higher in other known dietary studies. There is some evidence of prey partitioning (which can be potentially delineated both by prey species and body size of prey items taken) between the sexes. This is typical of raptors with pronounced size sexual dimorphism, as is the case in martial eagles. For instance, in populations where large adult monitor lizards are significant as prey, they only start to appear in prey remains at nests only after the female resumes hunting in the latter part of the breeding season. The species was the focus for a study using web sourced photography to explore the species' diet across its African range, this study revealed new insight into difference in prey composition between regions, and also revealed differences in prey composition between adult and sub-adult birds, with adults found to prey more frequently on bird prey than sub-adults. The sexual dimorphism of kills was verified in studies from the Great Rift Valley and Maasai Mara.

Mammals
The most diverse class of prey in the diet as known are mammals, with over 90 mammalian prey species reported. In the Cape Province, the  cape hare (Lepus capensis) reportedly dominates the prey selection, comprising about 53% of the foods selected. Other lagomorphs, namely the slightly smaller Smith's red rock hare (Pronolagus rupestris), mildly larger African savanna hare (Lepus microtis) and the much larger  scrub hare (Lepus saxatilis), are not infrequently taken both in and outside of the Cape area. For the most part rodents are ignored as prey as they are probably too small despite martial eagles taking at times appreciable numbers of Cape (Xerus inauris) and unstriped ground squirrels (Xerus rutilus). However, rodents selected as prey have ranged in size from the  Southern African vlei rat (Otomys irroratus) to the  South African springhare (Pedetes capensis) and the  greater cane rat (Thryonomys swinderianus).

Locally, large numbers are taken of any species of hyrax. The attractiveness of hyraxes as a prey resource may encourage martial eagles to vary their hunting techniques to potentially more time-consuming perch hunting so that they may capture rock hyraxes from rock formations and tree hyraxes from trees, contrary to their usual preference for capturing prey on the ground in the open after soaring high.

Although far less accomplished and prolific as a predator of monkeys than the crowned eagle, the martial eagle has been known to prey on at least 14 species of monkey. These monkey species have special alarm calls, distinct from those uttered in response to the presence of for example a leopard (Panthera pardus), specifically for martial eagles. Martial eagles are also known to prey on  lesser spot-nosed monkeys (Cercopithecus petaurista), Lowe's mona monkeys (Cercopithecus lowei),  Tana River mangabeys (Cercocebus galeritus), and possibly larger red colobus (colobus badius). Predatory attacks on juvenile baboons (Papio sp.) by martial eagles have been reported, especially olive baboons (Papio anubis). On at least one occasion, this species has attacked humans with apparently predatory intent, making it one of the only birds of prey to do so. In 2019 a young boy was killed and two other children injured by an immature martial eagle in the Ethiopian town of Gaashaamo.

Carnivores are important prey for martial eagles. Among these many mongoose tend to be well represented in their diet. Most mongooses native to the savanna tend to be highly social burrowers. Most of these types of mongoose are also relatively small (probably the second smallest important martial eagle food source after korhaans) and can effectively escape quickly to the safety of their underground home, so the lighter, more nimble male martial eagle is more likely to habitually pursue them. In southern Africa, the  meerkat (Suricata suricatta) comprises up to at least 9.6% of prey remains (as in the Cape Province) and the  Cape grey mongoose (Galerella pulverulenta) comprising an average of 7.2% of prey remains in the Cape area. In pooled data from the Great Rift Valley and Maasai Mara, the banded mongoose fell third behind only francolins and hares as the most regularly selected prey for martial eagles. Despite often being successful in capturing banded mongoose, in one case when a (presumably inexperienced) immature martial eagle took one to a tree, the dominant male banded mongoose of the group scaled the tree and pulled the still-living mongoose prey to safety. The martial eagle is a known predator of the full size range of mongoose species, from the smallest species, the  common dwarf mongoose (Helogale parvula), to the largest, the  white-tailed mongoose (Ichneumia albicauda). Other moderate-sized carnivores known to fall prey to martial eagles include  striped polecat (Ictonyx striatus) and a few species of genet, which are about twice as heavy on average as the polecat. The martial eagle, however, can be a surprisingly effective predator of carnivorans close to their own size or larger. Even larger black-backed jackals (Canis mesomelas) are occasionally targeted as prey, especially young pups. Adult domestic dogs (Canis familiaris) of up to a modest size may occasionally be killed by martial eagles. Martial eagles are also known to opportunistically grab pups of African wild dogs (Lycaon pictus) as they emerge from their dens. A similarly impressive range of felids have been included in their prey spectrum. Adults of both domestic cats and their ancestors, the  African wildcat (Felis lybica), are known to fall prey to this species. Much larger cat species such as servals (Leptailurus serval) and caracals (Caracal caracal) are taken, mainly kittens but even reportedly adults. Apparent predatory attacks are even attempted on big cat cubs as they are considered potential predators of lion and leopard (Panthera pardus) cubs and confirmed predators of cheetah (Acinonyx jubatus) cubs. However, they rapidly abandon hunting attempts if the formidable mother lion or leopard is present. Successful predatory attacks on other carnivores have included small African civet (Civettictis civetta) and the juvenile aardwolf (Proteles cristata).

While large accipitrids from around the world are credited with attacks on young or small ungulates, perhaps no other species is as accomplished in this regard as this martial eagle. Over 30 species of ungulate have been identified as prey for this species, more species than are attributed to the perhaps more powerful crowned eagles and all the world's golden eagles, although in all three seldom ungulates in a given region comprise more than 30% of the diet. In Kruger National Park, the martial eagle is mentioned as the only bird considered as a major predator of ungulate species. A majority of the ungulate diet of martial eagles are comprised by small antelope species or the young of larger antelopes. Locally favored prey are the dik-diks, one of the smallest kinds of antelope, and every known species may be vulnerable to this eagle. In Tsavo East National Park, Kirk's dik-dik (Madoqua kirkii) were the second most numerous prey species and it was estimated that at least 86 dik-diks are taken in the park over the course of the year by two pairs of martial eagles. In Maasai Mara, young ungulates appeared particularly significant in the diet of adult female martial eagles, with impala fawns averaging an estimated  comprising 34.2% of female kills (and 13.6% of the species' overall foods) and Thomson's gazelle fawns at about  comprising a further 15.1% of female kills (and 10.5% of the overall diet here). Calves, including neonatal young, of the following antelope may also be included in their prey spectrum: impala (Aepyceros melampus), hartebeest (Alcelaphus buselaphus), bontebok (Damaliscus pygargus), common tsessebe (Damaliscus lunatus), springbok (Antidorcas marsupialis), Eudorcas gazelles, gerenuk (Litocranius walleri), bushbuck (Tragelaphus sylvaticus), grey rhebok (Pelea capreolus), kob (Kobus kob) and mountain reedbuck (Redunca arundinum). For the newborn impala, weighing already , the martial eagle is the only bird considered to be a significant predator. Additionally, piglets of warthogs (Phacochoerus africanus) (of which only the martial eagle among accipitrids is similarly mentioned as a significant predator) and bushpigs (Potamochoerus larvatus) are taken. Adults of other small antelope such as  suni (Neotragus moschatus) and  blue duikers (Philantomba monticola) are probably also taken with relative ease. In general, the young of other antelope are usually attacked, including newborns. One duiker dispatched via strangulation weighed an estimated , one of the largest known raptorial kill for any species on the African continent. 

Birds

Compared to the range and sizes of mammals included in their prey spectrum, birds taken by martial eagles may seem less impressive as a whole, but the morphology of the martial eagle, including large wing surface areas, pronounced sexual dimorphism and relatively long toes, shows that the species is at least partially specialized to hunt avian prey. Birds  are universally considered by biologists more difficult to capture than mammals of the same size. In all, more than 50 bird species have been identified as the prey of martial eagles. The most significant portion of the avian diet is comprised by medium-sized terrestrial upland birds such as guineafowl, spurfowl, francolins and bustards. In total more than a dozen species of the galliform order and the bustard family each have been identified as their prey. When attacking these ground-loving birds, which are understandably quite easily spooked and usually react to potential danger by flying off, martial eagles almost always try to take them on the ground much like they do mammalian prey. If the birds take flight, the hunting attempt will fail, although a hunting eagle may try to surprise the same birds again. In Niger, the most numerous prey species is apparently the  helmeted guineafowl (Numida meleagris). Other guineafowl such as the vulturine (Acryllium vulturinum) and crested guineafowl (Guttera edouardi) are also readily taken elsewhere. Guineafowl and spurfowl were stated as the most numerous prey for martial eagles in Kruger National Park. In Tsavo East National Park, the  red-crested korhaan (Lophotis ruficrista), perhaps the smallest bustard the eagle hunts, is the most numerous prey taken, comprising about 39% of the prey remains. In the Great Rift Valley and Maasai Mara data, the Coqui francolin (Peliperdix coqui) was reportedly the most regularly identified prey and, in separate studies, helmeted guineafowl averaging  made up 12% of the foods in Maasai Mara. Medium-sized bustards such as the  Hartlaub's bustard (Lissotis hartlaubii) and the  karoo korhaan (Eupodotis vigorsii) were oft-taken supplemental prey in Tsavo East and the Cape Province, respectively. Although these are not usually taken in large numbers, martial eagles are one of the main predators of larger bustards. One protracted battle resulted in an injured leg for the eagle and massive, fatal blood loss for the male bustard, which was ultimately scavenged by a jackal by the following morning.

Despite its preference for ground-dwelling avian prey, a surprisingly considerable number of water birds may also be attacked. Waterfowl known to be attacked include the  South African shelduck (Tadorna cana),  yellow-billed duck (Anas undulata), the  spur-winged goose (Plectropterus gambensis) (Africa's largest waterfowl species) and especially the peculiar, overly bold and aggressive  Egyptian goose (Alopochen aegyptiaca), which is one of the main prey species for martial eagles in Kruger National Park. Larger wading birds are also fairly frequently attacked including herons and egrets, flamingoes storks, ibises, spoonbills and cranes. The diversity and number of storks taken is particularly impressive. One naturalists observed up to a half dozen attacks in different parts of Africa on  white storks (Ciconia ciconia). Further avian prey may extent to sandgrouse, pigeons and doves, hornbills and crows. At the other end of the scale, some martial eagles may capture a few small social species of passerine, which are exceptionally small prey (the smallest recorded prey species for the eagle overall), potentially consisting of the  red-billed queleas (Quelea quelea) and the  sociable weavers (Philetairus socius), as practically every meat-eating bird in Africa may be attracted to these species’ colonial abundance.

Reptiles

Reptiles can be locally important in the diet, and they are known to take larger numbers of reptiles than other large African booted eagles. Only relatively large reptiles, it seems, are attacked and many of this prey is also potentially dangerous, so martial eagles have unusually long, gracile tarsi, perhaps an adaptation to dangerous large reptilian prey. Based on the photographic analysis, reptilian prey, predominately adult monitors comprise 21% of the total 239 prey items. In particular, in the former Transvaal province of northeastern South Africa, reptiles were the main prey, with monitor lizards alone comprising just under half of the prey remains. A small food study in Zimbabwe found that 69% of 39 prey items were made up of monitor lizards. Large monitors such as rock monitors (Varanus albigularis), the nile monitors (Varanus niloticus) and the savannah monitors (Varanus exanthematicus) are mainly taken. So most of the hunts are ambushes on adult monitors by mature female eagles. Sometimes a lengthy struggle will ensue as the eagles try to get a good grip on the tough back skin of the monitors while simultaneously trying to control their necks to avoid the prey's powerful jaws, however, the eagles are usually successful in dispatching the large lizards.

Other reptiles are also occasionally taken. In Kruger National Park, reptiles as a whole made up 38% of the prey remains. These consisted of monitor lizards as well as a wide range of snakes. Elsewhere, snouted cobras (Naja annulifera) may added to the list of their prey spectrum. Even youngsters of the African rock python (Python sebae), the largest African snake was taken. Tent tortoises (Psammobates tentorius) and possibly Bell's hinge-back tortoises (Kinixys spekii) are also taken by martial eagles,  In one case, an estimated  nile crocodile (Crocodylus niloticus) was captured and flown with by a martial eagle.

Interspecies predatory relationships

For terrestrial predators, including birds of prey, sub-Saharan Africa may be the most competitive environment in the modern world. Due to great diversity of raptors present, each species have shown adaptive specializations, which may consist of various morphological differences that allow them to capitalize on distinct prey selection, hunting methods, habitat and/or nesting habits. The larger booted eagles that dominate the avian food chain in Africa consists of martial eagles,  Verreaux's eagles and  crowned eagles, which due to their size and conspicuousness may lend themselves to comparisons. While prey species may overlap in these in southern Africa and some parts of east Africa, where the prey size range of all three eagles averages , these three powerful eagles differ considerably in habitat preferences, nesting habits and hunting methods. The Verreaux's eagle nests in and hunts around rocky, mountainous kopje to be in close proximity to the much favored prey, rock hyraxes, which they mainly use contour-hunting (hugging the uneven ground to surprise the prey) to capture. The crowned eagle dwells mainly in mature forests, building nests in large interior trees, and is primarily a perch-hunter, watching and listening for monkeys and other prey over a long period. While all three are known to locally favor rock hyraxes, the nesting habitat differences where they overlap are sufficient to allow these birds not to effect one another. The mean prey mass of crowned eagles in southern Africa also appears to be similar to that of martial eagles but in west Africa (i.e.

More similar in habitat and, locally, prey selection to martial eagles are three medium-sized eagles, the  African hawk-eagle (Aquila spilogaster), the  tawny eagle (Aquila rapax) and the  bateleur (Terathopius ecaudatus). The biology of martial eagles was compared extensively with that of these species in Tsavo East National Park, Kenya, where all four were known to prey on large numbers of Kirk's dik-diks (albeit none of these took as many as did the martial eagles and some eaten by bateleurs and tawny eagles are probably scavenged). It was found that the bateleur and tawny eagle are even broader in their prey composition and take live prey more often of a smaller size, also often coming to and feeding on carrion (which is seldom seen in martial eagles) and pirating from other raptors, especially the tawny eagles. The African hawk-eagle takes fairly similar prey to the martial eagle but does not conflict with martial eagles considering its much smaller size and preference for slightly denser wooded areas. In Tsavo East, 29% of prey of tawny eagle and 21% of bateleur foods were the same as that of martial eagles. In east Africa, the breeding season differs mildly between these eagles with bateleurs nesting much earlier than the others and African hawk-eagles breeding peaking slightly later. Thus pressure on shared prey types such as dik-diks are exerted at different times of the year. Due to its large size and broad wings, martial eagles are not highly maneuverable in flight and are not infrequently robbed of their catches by these more agile and swift smaller eagles, particularly bold tawny eagles. Other raptors known to steal food from martial eagles include bateleurs and even other large species such as Verreaux's eagles and lappet-faced vultures (Torgos tracheliotos). Considering their potential for aggressiveness in regards to prey pursuits, martial eagles often appear to be surprisingly passive in response to kleptoparasitism, especially if they are able to first fill their crop. This may be because they try to avoid unnecessary expenditures of energy in contention over food. Leopards also rarely steal kills from martial eagles but may also be robbed of small kills by martial eagles, as may cheetahs. In another case, a martial eagle stole a rock hyrax from a bearded vulture (Gypaetus barbatus). Prey species are shared by a wide range of birds of prey, both other eagles and other, usually, larger raptors, and mammalian carnivores of many sizes that are too numerous to mention. Some mammalian carnivores such as caracals have superficially similar diets to martial eagles. Therefore, some consider the eagle owl to be the martial eagle's nocturnal ecological equivalent. While there is considerable overlap in their diets, there are discrepancies as the eagle owl tends to hunt large numbers of hedgehogs (not known in the eagle's diet) and occasionally high quantities of mole-rats. When considered this in combination with their different times of activity and the fact that the eagle owl weighs about half as much as the martial eagle, direct competition probably does not affect either predator in any considerable way.

The martial eagle infrequently hunts other birds of prey, perhaps doing so only slightly more often than do crowned eagles and Verreaux's eagles. In comparison, the temperate-zone-dwelling golden eagle is a frequent predator of other birds of prey. This may be due to more scarce prey resources in colder regions forcing eagles to pursue difficult prey such as this more frequently, whereas booted eagles in rich Africa biospheres may not need to do so as much. Nonetheless, a somewhat diverse range of raptorial birds have been identified as prey for martial eagles: the  lanner falcon (Falco biarmicus), the  peregrine falcon (Falco peregrinus), the  spotted eagle owl (Bubo africanus) (with a surprisingly large number of 6 found at one nest in Tsavo East), the  pale chanting goshawk (Melierax canorus), the  hooded vulture (Necrosyrtes monachus) (in one case after a protracted aerial battle), the  white-headed vulture (Trigonoceps occipitalis) and even Africa's largest bird of prey, the  Cape vulture (Gyps coprotheres). As apex predators, martial eagles are themselves largely invulnerable to predation. A video exists that purportedly depicts a leopard killing a martial eagle but this eagle was misidentified as it actually features a leopard preying on an immature African fish eagle (Haliaeetus vociferus) (and, at that, one that was possibly grounded for unknown reasons). There are, however, verified (if rare) cases of caracals preying on sleeping martial eagles at night, by climbing trees and pouncing in an ambush. Additionally a case was reported where a honey badger killed an incubating adult martial eagle. It is possible that leopards may too ambush sleeping eagles, but post-fledgling martial eagles are known to be highly wary, and healthy individuals a great majority of the time will successfully evade potential dangers by day. Predation on nests of martial eagles, beyond those by humans, are little known, with no verified depredations known in the literature, but are likely to occur.

Territoriality
Despite their rather aerial existence, the territorial display of adult martial eagles is considered relatively unspectacular. Their display often consists of nothing more than the adult male or both members of a pair circling and calling over their home range area or perching and calling near nestlings. Compared to other large African booted eagles, this species infrequently “sky-dances” (i.e. undulation and dramatic movements high in the sky), but some are known with presumably the male martial eagle only engaging in shallow undulations. During mutual circling, the adult female may turn and present talons. Martial eagles are not known to “cartwheel” which is when two eagles lock feet and circle down, falling almost to the ground, an action that was once thought to be part of breeding displays but is now generally considered territorial in nature. The territory of martial eagles can vary greatly in size. By the 1990s, approximately 100 pairs were estimated to breed in Hwange. This disparity in territory sizes are likely due to regional differences in food supply, persecution rates and habitat disturbance.

Breeding

Martial eagles may breed in various months in the different parts of their range. They are considered a fairly early breeder compared to the average for sub-Saharan Africa birds of prey but breed much less early than bateleurs. The mating season is in November through April in Senegal, January to June in Sudan, August to July in northeast Africa and almost any month in east Africa and southern Africa, though mostly in April–November. The breeding season may thus begin in various parts of the range in a wet season or the earlier or later part of the local dry season so that no part of the brooding stage will occur during heavy rains. They build their nests in large trees, often larger than other trees in the woodlot. Tree species is unimportant with the eagles seeming to prefer any type that is difficult to climb, such as those that have thorny branches, few lower branches or smoother bark. In Kalahari Gemsbok National Park of South Africa, almost all nests were in the highly thorny, Acacia-like tree, Vachellia erioloba, in savanna areas. Often trees used are on the sides of cliffs, ridges, valley or hilltop, with one nest having been found within a cave. In the karoo of South Africa, they have also nested on electric-power pylons. Locally, with the sometimes epidemic levels of clear-cutting of old-growth trees, such pylons may provide a fairly suitable alternative that the eagles can utilize in absence of woodlands. The nest of the martial eagle is a large and conspicuous construction of sticks. The nest may be lightly lined with green leaves. The nest of martial eagles average slightly smaller than those of crowned eagles and, compared to other large eagle tree nests, are much broader than they are deep, relatively, especially when newly constructed. The construction of new nests can take several months and, in some cases, pairs can take up to two months where they appear to return to the nests daily but contribute only green leaves to line the nest. The repair of an existing nest takes on average two to three weeks. Most pairs will usually just use one nest (as opposed to temperate-zone eagles which may have several alternate nests), with up to 21 years of continuous use for one nest recorded, but pairs constructing a second nest are not infrequent either. One exceptionally prolific pair built or repaired 7 nests during 17 years in Zimbabwe, although they only nested 5 of the 17 years.

Martial eagles have a slow breeding rate, laying usually one egg (rarely two) every two years. Clutches of two have only been reported only in South Africa and once in Zambia, and the younger sibling probably never survives or possibly ever even hatches unless the first egg or hatchling dies. Martial eagle eggs are rounded oval and are white to pale greenish-blue, variously. Sometimes they may be handsomely marked with brown and grey blotches. Their eggs are the largest of any booted eagle, slightly larger on average than those of golden or Verreaux's eagle and considerably larger than those of crowned eagles. The egg is incubated for 45 to 53 days. The female does a great majority of the incubation, as is typical, but the male may relieve her and incubate for a maximum of three hours in a day. If the nest is approached by humans, the female tends to sit tight, often only flying off once the nest is reached. Unlike the crowned eagle, the martial eagle is not known to protectively attack animals such as humans who come too close to the nest, usually just unobtrusively abandoning the nest until the person leaves the area, in a similar fashion to Aquila eagles. However, if maimed or grounded themselves, martial eagles are known to viciously turn on their human tormentors until they are finished off, in some anecdotal claims of early hunting journals, an occasion hunting accident have resulted in martial eagles tearing the flesh down to the bone on the legs of game wardens and even broken arms with their powerful grip. Although these accounts are quite possibly exaggerated, the ferocity of cornered martial eagles may have some influence on its name. Once the eggs hatch, the male of a pair may rarely brood the young but has never been seen to the feed the chick and, for the most part, the male just brings prey for the female to distribute between herself and the nestling. The female attendance at the nest drops considerably at seven weeks after hatching, at which point she resumes hunting. Then, the female may become main food provider but males will also make deliveries. Despite her lower attendance, she still roosts on or near the nest until the nestling stage is done. Despite the occasional capture of food, the male usually is rarely seen near the nest after the female resumes hunting. In one unusual case, a first or second year plumaged male martial eagle was seen assisting an adult female in the way that an adult male would but it was not known if he had merely replaced a deceased male that had sired the young or had actually bred with the female, the following year the young male was verified to mate with the female. Cases of immature plumaged eagles breeding are often considered indicative of stress on a species’ regional population. 

The newly hatched chick tends to have a two-tone down pattern which is dark grey above and white below, which lightens at about four weeks of age, with the down becoming pale-grey. At 7 weeks, the feathers mostly cover the down and do so completely by 10 weeks except that at that stage the flight feathers are underdeveloped. The new chick is usually quite weak and feeble, becoming more active only after they are 20 days old. The nestlings usually first feeds itself at 9 to 11 weeks old, while it tends to engage in vigorous wing exercises performed from 10 weeks on. Like crowned eagles, males seem to be more active than female youngsters and probably fly sooner too. In one case, a male fledged prematurely at 75 days, however it is possible that male fledging can occur at less than 90 days. Most estimations place fledging as occurring at 96 to 109 days, on average at about 99 days of age.  However, after making their first flight, the fledgling usually return to roost in the nest for several days, before gradually moving away from it. Despite increasing signs of independence (such as flight and beginning to practice hunting), in extreme cases, juvenile birds may remain in the care of their parents for a further 6 to 12 months. A typical post-fledgling care stage will continue for about 3 months after fledging. Despite its ability to fly, it will continue to beg for food from both parents as they are seen. Sometimes, the young eagle from the prior mating season may still be present at the onset of the next breeding season. Juvenile eagles may return to their nest site at as old as 3 years of age, but are unlikely to be fed. On the other hand, juvenile martial eagle soar much more readily than crowned eagles and, unlike that species, have been recorded traveling up to several miles from the nest 3 to 4 months after making their first flight. Due to this long dependence period, these eagles can usually only mate in alternate years.

Breeding success is variable and is probably driven by a combination of factors, including prey supply, rainfall levels and distance from human activity. In Kenya in the 1960s, breeding success at producing a fledgling was 72% for all eggs and 48% for all possible attempts. Here, various pairs reared between 0.25 and 1 young per pair, averaging 0.55. In the Namibian Nest Record Scheme, where young were monitored for more than two months, success has also been estimated at 83%, i.e. five out of six attempts. At Kalahari Gemsbok National Park, South Africa, 38 of 53 martial eagle breeding attempts were in consecutive years and fledged an average 0.43 young per year. In 63 pair years, an average of 0.51 fledglings per pair was found for the former Transvaal province of South Africa. Breeding is characterized as exceptionally erratic but the inconsistencies of their breeding habits in the last few centuries may have unnatural influences, due to this species sensitivity to human disturbance and high rates of persecution they suffer under humans. Breeding may occur as frequent as in 4 consecutive years or only once every three years with no consistent biannual breeding pattern as in the crowned eagle.  In Zimbabwe, a pair studied for 18 years had a replacement rate of 0.44 but bred very erratically: 3 eggs from 4 clutches, then only twice in next 9 years, then reared no young until they bred again and produced 5 young in 5 successive years. The immature eagle, with an average of about four years before it can expect its first breeding season, spends much of its time subsequent to its final separation from its parents looking for feeding opportunities and refining its hunting techniques. There is evidence of a young eagle engaging in a form of play where it throws and tries to catch sticks, a probable form of hunting practice. Almost without predators and other natural threats, the martial eagles is quite a long-lived bird with an average lifespan estimated to be 12 to 14 years. The longevity record for a wild eagle of the species is now 31.4 years of age. However, due to fact that they do not reproduce under normal circumstances until they are 6 to 7 years old and their sporadic, widely placed breeding attempts, makes the martial eagle an exceptionally unproductive bird with very low population replacement levels.

Conservation issues

The martial eagle is probably naturally scarce, due to its requirement for large territories and low reproductive rates. Nonetheless, the species has been experiencing a major decline in numbers in recent years, due largely to being directly killed by humans. Its conservation status was uplisted to Near Threatened in 2009 and to Vulnerable in 2013, and once again to Endangered in 2020. As a regional example of their decline: in the former Transvaal Province of South Africa, the total estimated martial eagles present dropped from about 1,500 in the mid-20th century to fewer than 500 by the 1990s. In terms of the level of decline, it rivals the bateleur as the most reduced of all African eagles, a fact already apparent even up to half a century ago from the 2010s. In many areas where they come into contact with humans, eagle populations have decreased greatly through persecution via shooting and poisoning. The reasoning behind such persecution is that martial eagles are taken as a predatory threat to livestock. Despite this perception, in reality domestic animals constitute only a small proportion of the species' diet, whereas the presence of eagles is a sure sign of a healthy environment. In the Cape Province of South Africa, for example, no more than 8% of the diet appeared to consist of domestic stock. This does not take into account, that unlike previously thought, martial eagles do not disdain carrion and some birds, especially immature, are certain to attend carcasses of livestock at times, leading to them being mistaken as stock-killers. 76% of martial eagles, almost all of which were clearly shot, brought into the Natural History Museum of Zimbabwe were immature ones, thus immature martial eagles are far more prone to come to livestock as a food source. However, martial eagles will indeed at times kill not inconsiderable numbers of livestock, including goats and sheep (mostly young kids and lambs), chickens, most variety of pets, piglets and possibly newborn calves. The local name of martial eagles in South Africa is lammervanger (or “lamb catcher”). The total number of livestock that martial eagles kill annually is controversial, as the claims made by farmers rival those of Verreaux's eagles and exceed in quantity those made against wedge-tailed eagles and even the much wider ranging golden eagles (both locally considered dangerous to livestock). Up to several hundred of livestock kills annually are blamed on them in South Africa alone. The martial eagle, alongside Verreaux's, thus takes the unfortunate title of being allegedly the two most dangerous birds in the world to livestock. However biologists have agreed for some time that the numbers claimed to be killed by martial eagles are considerably exaggerated. Into the 21st century, the martial eagle continue to be strongly disliked by farmers and shot at on sight, even by those favorable towards other eagle species.

In southern Africa, many martial eagles have taken to nesting on high-tension pylons in areas that are now often absent of large trees, it is one of the few raptors to actually possibly reap more benefit than harm from the presence of these (death by collision with wires and pylons is now one of the worst killers of birds of prey, especially in Europe and southern Africa). However, collision with power lines can be a serious source of mortality, being a common modern problem for especially immature martial eagles, which are less self-assured fliers. Another hazard is caused by steep sided farm reservoirs in South Africa, in which many birds drown. Of 68 eagle drownings there, 38% were martial eagles, the highest percentage of any raptor recorded to be killed by this (again mostly immatures are claimed by this cause of mortality). In South Africa, this eagle may have lost 20% of its population in the last three generations due to such collisions. Further exacerbating the problems faced by the martial eagle, habitat destruction and reduction of prey continues to occur at a high rate outside of protected areas. Due to this large swathes of their former breeding range are now unsuitable. The preservation of this species depends on education of farmers and other local people, and the increase of protected areas where the species can nest and hunt without excessive disturbance.

References

External links

 Martial eagle - Species text in The Atlas of Southern African Birds
 Martial eagle at Raptors Namibia
 Martial eagle videos on the Internet Bird Collection
 Object play of an immature martial eagle

martial eagle
martial eagle
Birds of prey of Sub-Saharan Africa
martial eagle
martial eagle